This is a list of prime ministers of Australia by time in office. The basis of the list is the inclusive number of days from being sworn in until leaving office, if counted by number of calendar days all the figures would be one greater.

Rank by time in office  
Parties

Political parties by time in office

Notes

See also
 Prime Minister of Australia
 List of prime ministers of Australia
 List of prime ministers of Australia (graphical)
 List of Australian heads of government by time in office
List of premiers of New South Wales by time in office
List of premiers of Queensland by time in office
List of premiers of South Australia by time in office
List of premiers of Tasmania by time in office
List of premiers of Victoria by time in office
List of premiers of Western Australia by time in office
List of chief ministers of the Northern Territory by time in office
List of chief ministers of the Australian Capital Territory by time in office
 List of prime ministers of Canada by time in office
 List of prime ministers of New Zealand by time in office
 List of prime ministers of the United Kingdom by length of tenure

References

External links
 From Menzies to Malcolm: the careers of Australia's prime ministers visualised
 Terms of Australian Prime Ministers Since 1901

Time
Australia, Prime Minister